The 2022 European Junior Badminton Championships are held at the Athletic Hall Belgrade in Belgrade, Serbia from 18 to 27 August 2022 to crown the best U-19 badminton players across Europe.

Tournament 
The 2022 European Junior Badminton Championships was organized by Badminton Europe and Badminton Association of Serbia. This tournament consists of team and individual events. There are 32 teams competing in the mixed team event, which is being held from 18 to 22 August, while the individual events will be held from 22 to 27 August.

Venue 
This international tournament will be held at Athletic Hall Belgrade in Belgrade, Serbia.

Medal summary

Medalists

Medal table

Team event

Group stage

Group 1

France vs Türkiye

Scotland vs Ireland

France vs Ireland

Scotland vs Türkiye

Ireland vs Türkiye

France vs Scotland

Group 2

Denmark vs Belgium

Finland vs Slovenia

Denmark vs Slovenia

Finland vs Belgium

Slovenia vs Belgium

Denmark vs Finland

Group 3

Greece vs Serbia

Germany vs Portugal

Germany vs Serbia

Greece vs Portugal

Serbia vs Portugal

Germany vs Greece

Group 4

Spain vs Italy

Netherlands vs Israel

Spain vs Israel

Netherlands vs Italy

Israel vs Italy

Spain vs Netherlands

Group 5

Czech Republic vs Estonia

Latvia vs Poland

Czech Republic vs Poland

Latvia vs Estonia

Poland vs Estonia

Czech Republic vs Latvia

Group 6

Ukraine vs Romania

Croatia vs Hungary

Ukraine vs Hungary

Croatia vs Romania

Hungary vs Romania

Ukraine vs Croatia

Group 7

Switzerland vs Slovakia

Sweden vs Austria

Switzerland vs Austria

Sweden vs Slovakia

Austria vs Slovakia

Switzerland vs Sweden

Group 8

England vs Lithuania

Norway vs Bulgaria

England vs Bulgaria

Norway vs Lithuania

Bulgaria vs Lithuania

England vs Norway

Knockout stage

Quarter-finals

France vs Sweden

Spain vs Czech Republic

Ukraine vs Germany

England vs Denmark

Semi-finals

France vs Spain

Ukraine vs Denmark

Final

France vs Denmark

References

External links 
Official Website
Team Event
Individual Event

European Junior Badminton Championships
European Junior Badminton Championships
European Junior Badminton Championships
European Junior Badminton Championships
International sports competitions hosted by Serbia